Ruislip-Northwood may refer to:

the former Ruislip-Northwood Urban District
Ruislip-Northwood (UK Parliament constituency)